José Carlos Nogueira Júnior, commonly known as Juninho or José Júnior (born 18 July 1985), is a Brazilian footballer who plays for Estrela do Norte Futebol Clube (ES) as a forward.

Career
In early of 2009, Juninho joined Duque de Caxias. He made his competitive debut on 31 January, in a 3–1 Campeonato Carioca loss against Vasco da Gama, when he came on for Dudu in the 66th minute. Juninho scored his first goal on 31 March, netting Duque's second in a 4–2 victory over Mesquita.

In July 2009, after short trial period, he was bought by Bulgarian A PFG club Slavia Sofia. He made his competitive debut on 10 August, during an A PFG match against Sportist Svoge. Juninho proved crucial for many Slavia matches, making his famous runs down the left wing, and quickly became a first choice for the left winger or second striker position. On 29 August he scored his first goal for the club against Levski Sofia but Slavia went on to lose the game 1–3. On 22 November Juninho scored three goals against Chernomorets Burgas and became the second foreign player after Ljubomir Vorkapić to score a hat trick for Slavia in the team's history.

On 20 August 2010 Junior was loaned to the end of the year to Armenian side Banants.

On 13 February 2012, it was announced that Juninho would be loaned to fellow A PFG side Levski Sofia for the rest of the 2011–12 season, with an option to make the move permanent.

On 5 September 2012, Juninhoagreed to go on a loan to Turkish side Adana Demirspor which is commonly called as The Blue Lightning – Mavi Şimşekler. He made his debut on 16 September 2012 at the TFF First League against Denizlispor. He scored his first goal for Adana Demirspor on the 44th minute of the match against Kayseri Erciyesspor. Juninho carried his team to playoffs with 14 league goals which made him the 3rd top scorer in TFF First League in 2012–2013 season but Adana Demirspor eliminated by Manisaspor in semi-final of playoffs and postponed its chance to promote Turkish Süper Lig to another year.

Career statistics

Statistics accurate as of match played 12 June 2013

References

External links

 Profile at zerozero.pt
 Profile at LevskiSofia.info

1985 births
Living people
Brazilian footballers
Brazilian expatriate footballers
Duque de Caxias Futebol Clube players
PFC Slavia Sofia players
FC Urartu players
PFC Levski Sofia players
Adana Demirspor footballers
Karşıyaka S.K. footballers
FC Milsami Orhei players
Associação Atlética Caldense players
Tupi Football Club players
First Professional Football League (Bulgaria) players
Armenian Premier League players
Brazilian expatriate sportspeople in Bulgaria
Expatriate footballers in Bulgaria
Expatriate footballers in Armenia
Association football forwards
TFF First League players
Campeonato Brasileiro Série D players